Yuhuazhai Subdistrict (literally 'transform fish to dragon') is a subdistrict of Yanta District in the southern suburbs of Xi'an, the capital of Shaanxi province. As of 2010 it has a population of 127,204 people.

History 
In 1955, it was placed under the jurisdiction of Epang District. In 1958, Yuhuazhai Township became a people's commune, and was renamed to Bayi People's Commune in 1966. In 1972 its name was restored to Yuhuazhai People's Commune, and was reverted back to a township in 1984. Yuhuazhai became a subdistrict in 1988.

Urban village demolition
By the early 2010s, an area including Yuhuazhai Subdistrict was identified as an urban village, nicknamed "Little Hong Kong", and rumors of its demolition and subsequent reconstruction were first floated in 2012. A 2018 article published by Sina reported that the urban village spanned an area of 3,000 mu, and was home to over 300,000 people. An official notice by the Yuhuazhai Subdistrict government announced plans to demolish the subdistrict's urban village by November 30, 2018, and offered a compensation agreement for residents to sign.

However, the United States government's news agency Radio Free Asia reported later in 2018 that over 1,000 demonstrators held protests in opposition to the demolition on December 2 and December 3. Alleged videos of the protests show riot police firing tear gas and attacking protesting villages, and Radio Free Asia reported that two protestors were injured in the confrontation and eight more were arrested. Protestors interviewed by Radio Free Asia also reported various government workers harassing and attacking residents who continued to occupy undemolished buildings in the weeks prior.

Administrative divisions 
As of 2020, Yuhuazhai Subdistrict has 3 residential communities (社区) and 10 administrative villages under its administration.

Residential communities 
Yuhuazhai Subdistrict's 3 residential communities are as follows:

 Shuili Community
 Yingfazhai Community
 Zhanghuzhai Community

Villages 
Yuhuazhai Subdistrict's 10 administrative villages are as follows:

 Yuhuazhai Village
 Xiaoyanzhuang Village
 Laoyanzhuang Village
 Hejiazhai Village
 Shuangqizhai Village
 Xichao Village
 Dongchao Village
 Xinfeng Village
 Zhousongzhai Village
 Leijiazhai Village

Demographics 
According to the 2010 Chinese Census, Yuhuazhai Subdistrict has a population of 127,204 people, more than double the population of 60,281 reported in the 2000 Chinese Census. A 1996 estimate put Yuhuazhai Subdistrict's population at about 37,000 people.

Economy 
The subdistrict is home to a number of factories.

References

Township-level divisions of Shaanxi